A tympanum (plural, tympana; from Greek and Latin words meaning "drum") is the semi-circular or triangular decorative wall surface over an entrance, door or window, which is bounded by a lintel and an arch. It often contains pedimental sculpture or other imagery or ornaments. Many architectural styles include this element.

Alternatively, the tympanum may hold an inscription, or in modern times, a clock face.

History

In ancient Greek, Roman and Christian architecture, tympana of religious buildings often contain pedimental sculpture or mosaics with religious imagery. A tympanum over a doorway is very often the most important, or only, location for monumental sculpture on the outside of a building. In classical architecture, and in classicising styles from the Renaissance onwards, major examples are usually triangular; in Romanesque architecture, tympana more often has a semi-circular shape, or that of a thinner slice from the top of a circle, and in Gothic architecture they have a more vertical shape, coming to a point at the top. These shapes naturally influence the typical compositions of any sculpture within the tympanum.

The upper portion of a gable when enclosed with a horizontal belt course, is also termed a tympanum.

Bands of molding surrounding the tympanum are referred to as the archivolt.

In medieval French architecture the tympanum is often supported by a decorated pillar called a trumeau.

Gallery

See also
 Lunette: semi-circular tympanum
 Church architecture
 Gable
 Pediment
 Portal

Citations

External links

 Sculpted tympanums Chartres Cathedral, West Front, Central Portal
 Tympanum of the last Judgment - western portal of the abbey-church of Saint Foy

Arches and vaults
Architectural elements